Pittenzie Halt railway station on the Crieff Junction Railway served the small hamlet of Pittachar, near Crieff in Scotland. The line was built in 1856 for the Crieff Junction Railway, which connected Crieff with the Scottish Central Railway at Crieff Junction (now Gleneagles).  The CJR was absorbed by the Caledonian Railway in 1865, which itself became part of the London, Midland and Scottish in 1923. The line and the station were closed as part of the Beeching closures in 1964.

References

Sources

Disused railway stations in Perth and Kinross
Beeching closures in Scotland
Railway stations in Great Britain opened in 1958
Railway stations in Great Britain closed in 1964
Railway stations opened by British Rail
Crieff